The China national rugby union team represents the People's Republic of China in international rugby union. China have yet to make their debut at the Rugby World Cup, but attempted to qualify in both 2003 and 2007.

China play their home games in shirts of amber and red with the Chinese flag in the right chest and the away strip is a red shirt with amber sleeves, the red flag is not so clear but still on the away strip being the same colour as the shirt.

The national side is ranked 82nd in the world.

History
China played its first international in 1997 against Singapore.

China attempted to qualify for the 2003 Rugby World Cup in Australia, taking part in the Asia qualifying tournaments. They started in Pool C of Round 1, playing matches against Sri Lanka and Kazakhstan. Played in April, China lost 9-7 to Sri Lanka, and then defeated Kazakhstan 57-15. They finished at the top of the final standings due to a better points difference, and advanced to Round 2. However, they were knocked out in Round 2, losing both their fixtures against Hong Kong and Chinese Taipei.

China participated in qualifying competitions for the 2007 Rugby World Cup as well. They started in Division 2 of Round 1, contesting matches against the Arabian Gulf rugby union team and Chinese Taipei. China defeated Chinese Taipei 22-19 in their first game, but lost against the Arabian Gulf team, seeing them finish second, and moving into Division 2 of Round 2. However, China lost both their fixtures in Round 2 against Hong Kong and Sri Lanka.  China was slated to participate in qualifying for the 2011 Rugby World Cup.  However, they were forced to drop out due to visa complications.

China's national sevens team regularly participates in legs of the annual sevens tour, appearing consistently in the Hong Kong tournament. China has traditionally fared quite well, with recent results including a bowl victory in 2007 and a win over Scotland in the 2008 pool stage.

Record

World Cup

Overall

Squad
Squad to 2019 Asia Rugby Championship 
Head coach:  Chenglong Liu

See also
 2003 Rugby World Cup - Asia qualification
 2007 Rugby World Cup - Asia qualification
 2011 Rugby World Cup - Asia qualification

References

External links
 China Rugby Union Official Site
 China at the IRB Official Site
 China  on rugbydata.com